Sir Liam Ó Seachnasaigh (died 1579) was an Irish Chief of the Name.

Ó Seachnasaigh was the eldest legitimate son of Sir Ruaidhrí Gilla Dubh Ó Seachnasaigh by Lady Honora O'Brien, daughter of Murrough O'Brien, 1st Earl of Thomond, but till 1573 had been usurped as Chief by his uncle, 
Diarmaid Riabach. Diarmaid was deposed but in 1579 ambushed Sir Liam at Ard Maoldubhain. The latter was killed, but had so severely wounded Diarmaid that he died shortly after of his wounds. Sir Liam was succeeded by his younger brother, Dermot.

References

 D'Alton, John, Illustrations, Historical and Genealogical, of King James's Irish Army List (1689). Dublin: 1st edition (single volume), 1855. pp. 328–32.
 History of Galway, James Hardiman, 1820
 Tabular pedigrees of O'Shaughnessy of Gort (1543–1783), Martin J. Blake, Journal of the Galway Archaeological and Historical Society, vi (1909–10), p. 64; vii (1911–12), p. 53.
 John O'Donovan. The Genealogies, Tribes, and Customs of Hy-Fiachrach. Dublin: Irish Archaeological Society. 1844. Pedigree of O'Shaughnessy: pp. 372–91.
 Old Galway, Professor Mary Donovan O'Sullivan, 1942
 Galway: Town and Gown, edited Moran et al., 1984
 Galway: History and Society, 1996

People from County Galway
Liam
16th-century Irish people
1579 deaths
Year of birth unknown